Congregation B'nai Amoona is an egalitarian Conservative synagogue, located at 324 South Mason Road in the American city of Creve Coeur, Missouri. B'nai Amoona has evolved from a small Orthodox congregation of primarily German-speaking members into one of the most prominent, conservative congregations in the United States.

History
Sometime in 1882 a few members of Sheerith Israel, St. Louis's largest Orthodox congregation, left to form a new congregation which, by 1884 was worshiping under the guidance of Rabbi Arron Levy. Between 1882 to 1888, they rented halls to hold services.

In January 1885, Rabbi Levy was succeeded by 26-year-old Rabbi Adolph Rosentreter, newly arrived from Berlin. The first public notice of the new congregation appeared in the St. Louis Post-Dispatch on August 15, 1884, as follows:A concert for the benefit of the Rev. Aaron Levy, the Jewish rabbi whose congregation seceded recently from Sheerith Israel Church, will be given at Druid's Hall, August 17. The congregation now worships regularly at Pohlman's Hall Broadway and Franklin Avenue, under the name B'nei Emounoh which means "Sons of Faith".

Starting in 1888, and until 1906, the synagogue was located at 13th and Carr. In 1893 the B'nai Amoona Cemetery was established.

From 1949 until 1985, synagogue was located at 524 Trinity Avenue in Creve Coeur, Missouri and this building is a National Register of Historic Places listings in St. Louis County, Missouri since 1984.

Led by Rabbi Carnie Shalom Rose,  the synagogue is associated with the United Synagogue of Conservative Judaism.

Garrison & Lucas
1903 - 1911 Hazzan Friedman1906 - 1919 Garrison and Lucas

Vernon and Academy & Rabbi Halpern
1917 - 1962 Rabbi Halpern
1919 - 1914 Academy and Vernon
1920 - 1960 Hazzan Gowseiow
1930        Men's Club founded
1945 - 1949 Washington Avenue converted office space

Rabbi Lipnick
1951 - 2010 Rabbi Bernard Lipnick (emeritus)
1969–present Hazzen Leon Lissek (emeritus)

Mason Road
1986        Mason Road
1991 - 2003 Rabbi Eric Cytryn
1998 - 2003 Cantor Robert Lieberman
2003–Present Cantorial Designate Sharon Nathanson
2005–Present Rabbi Carnie Shalom Rose

Today
Today, the congregation is an egalitarian Conservative synagogue.

Synagogue life features a Minyannaires program which guarantees Minyan twice daily, in the morning and evening. There are at least three Shabat services to choose from each week: The Family Service geared toward families and children up to second grade; Junior Congregation for third through sixth graders; the Learner's Service as well as the Traditional Shabbat Morning Service in the sanctuary.

Children in kindergarten through twelfth grade attend the B'nai Amoona Religious School which combines Hebrew and religious studies in an integrated program which meets twice weekly. The Early Childhood Center offers programs for infants through pre-kindergarten. The Al Fleishman Day Camps, B'nai Ami and Ramot Amoona, are modeled after Camp Ramah and keep children in preschool through sixth grade busy all summer. The B'nai Amoona United Synagogue Youth (BAUSY) offers programs for children beginning in the third grade all the way up to twelfth grade. B'nai Amoona and the Saul Mirowitz Jewish Day School [formerly the Solomon Schechter Day School] share a special relationship as they are housed on the same campus.

Adult education is conducted with classes on Wednesday evening, as well as Sunday and Wednesday mornings. Topics change often availing the program to a wide variety of interests. There are also scholar-in-residence programs.

Auxiliary groups are active at B'nai Amoona. Sisterhood and Men's Club have programs throughout the year. The Chavurah program (friendship groups) cater to various interests and age groups. The Social Action committee is engaged in Tikkun Olam or "healing the world".

B'nai Amoona is a Kosher institution and employs its own Masgichah to supervise Kashrut. In addition, B'nai Amoona is the only Conservative synagogue in St. Louis that maintains its own cemetery, located in University City, Missouri.

The congregation serves approximately 800 families serving Jews by birth and by choice as well as interfaith couples.

Services
The congregation maintains daily services including Minyan everyday of the week supported by a group known as the "Minyanaires" who ensure that there is always a quorum of ten people to hold the services.  The services include:

Programs

Education
Entitled "Pardes", The Meyer Kranzberg Center for Jewish Living and learning starts in Kindergarten and continues through twelfth grade, and encompasses formal, informal and family education. 

The school provides services to grade school children and through the Bnai Amoona ECC, services to children ages twelve months to five years.

The congregation also maintains an ongoing series of regular adult classes in addition to special programs.

Youth programs

United Synagogue Youth
The synagogue youth program is a program for the congregational youth beginning in grades 5 and 6 with Atid Amoona; Kadima (grades 7 and 8) and BAUSY for grades 9 through 12.  The program is encourages activity in United Synagogue Youth (USY) on the Chapter, Regional and International levels; Membership in several local clubs and conducts weekly meetings for all the programs.  BAUSY also actively conducts Shabbat Dinners, Saturday night programs and sleepovers.
For its efforts, B'nai Amoona USY was voted the EMTZA Region Chapter of the Year for 2009 - 2010.

Youth camps
The congregation maintains two summer camps for youth in the St Louis community, based on age.  Collectively known as the Alfred Fleishman Summer Camps, they are Ramot Amoona for older children and B'nai Ami for preschool children.

See also

 List of synagogues in the United States
 Religion in Missouri

Notes

References

 
 
 Congregation B'nai Amoona Golden Jubilee (1882–5642, 1932–5692) Commemorating the Fiftieth Anniversary of the founding of our congregation
 The Souvenir book for the Sixtieth Anniversary of B'nai Amoona; 1882–1942
 The Modern View-25th Anniversary 1900–1925 (a weekly newspaper chronicling Jewish life in St. Louis)
 Olitzky, Kerry M.; Raphael, Marc Lee (June 30, 1996). The American Synagogue: A Historical Dictionary and Sourcebook. Greenwood Press.  pp. 196–198.

External links
 

1882 establishments in Missouri
Conservative synagogues in Missouri
Religious buildings and structures in St. Louis County, Missouri
Religious organizations established in 1882